Grantshouse is a small village in Berwickshire in the Scottish Borders of Scotland. It lies on the A1, and its nearest railway stations are Dunbar to the north and Reston to the south.

See also
List of places in the Scottish Borders
List of places in Scotland

External links 

Official website
Community Council
The Village Hall
GEOGRAPH image: Grantshouse, Berwickshire

Villages in the Scottish Borders